Uttar Pradesh Cricket Association, formerly United Provinces Cricket Team, is the governing body of the Cricket activities in the Uttar Pradesh state of India and the Uttar Pradesh cricket team. It is affiliated to the Board of Control for Cricket in India.

History
Vijay Anand Gajapati Raj Bahadur, better known as the Maharajkumar of Vizianagram and Sir Padampat Singhania were the founders of Uttar Pradesh Cricket Association. Sir Padampat Singhania embellished Uttar Pradesh Cricket Association's location Green Park, which was requested by the Lady Green, who used to practice horse riding during those times. The Park is maintained and augmented by the Singhania’s ever since then. 
Sir Padampat Singhania was an Industrialist and a member of the Indian constituent Assembly. He was one of the youngest Federation of Indian Chambers of Commerce & Industry (FICCI) President during the year 1935-36. Sir Padampat Singhania has maintained the Greenpark and have been organising matches in Kanpur, he has been consistently paying towards the match fees, prizes and has even granted a special permit to the players of both the teams to stay in their heritage property, namely,  Kamla Retreat duirng the matches. His contribution to the cricket fraternity has been immense and Greenpark is still flourishing. JK put up their entire security, workforce, handling of the students gallery etc during all the matches.
Vijay Anand Gajapati Raj Bahadur was the founding President of Uttar Pradesh Cricket Association and Andhra Cricket Association. He was captain of the Indian cricket team in the 1930s and a cricket commentator in the 1960s. He is credited with furthering the development of cricket in Andhra and Uttar Pradesh. was the founding President of Uttar Pradesh Cricket Association and Andhra Cricket Association. He was captain of the Indian cricket team in the 1930s and a cricket commentator in the 1960s. He is credited with furthering the development of cricket in Andhra and Uttar Pradesh.

Home grounds
There are currently total 3 home grounds of UPCA-

 BRSABV Ekana cricket stadium (Capacity- 50,000) in Lucknow
 Green Park Stadium (Capacity- 39,000) in Kanpur
 Saifai Cricket stadium (Capacity- 43,000) in Etawah district

See also
 Uttar Pradesh cricket team
 BRSABV Ekana Cricket Stadium
 Green Park Stadium
 Uttar Pradesh cricket team
 Lucknow
 Kanpur

References

External links
 

1928 establishments in India
Cricket administration in India
Cricket in Uttar Pradesh
Sports organizations established in 1928
Organisations based in Kanpur